Fred Florence Hall is a historic building on the campus of Southern Methodist University in University Park, Texas, U.S.. It was built in 1924, and designed by DeWitt & Lemmon in the Georgian Revival architectural style. It has been listed on the National Register of Historic Places since September 27, 1980.

See also

National Register of Historic Places listings in Dallas County, Texas

References

External links

National Register of Historic Places in Dallas County, Texas
Georgian Revival architecture in Texas
School buildings completed in 1924
Southern Methodist University
1924 establishments in Texas